Branimir Cipetić (born 24 May 1995) is a Croatian-born Bosnian professional footballer who plays as a right-back for Prva HNL club Lokomotiva and the Bosnia and Herzegovina national team.

Club career
A youth product of hometown club Hajduk Split, Cipetić moved to Spain in 2013 and started his career as an amateur footballer there, before going professional joining Vitoria in 2017. In 2019, he signed with Bosnian Premier League club Široki Brijeg. He made his official debut for Široki Brijeg in a 2–2 draw against Sloboda Tuzla on 27 July 2019. Cipetić scored his first goal for Široki Brijeg in a cup game against GOŠK Gabela on 30 September 2020.

International career
Cipetić was born in Split, Croatia to Herzegovinian Croat parents, and raised in Kaštela. His father is from Kostajnica and his mother is from Prozor-Rama. On 17 August 2020, he was called up to represent the Bosnia and Herzegovina national team.

Cipetić made his international debut for Bosnia and Herzegovina in a 2020–21 UEFA Nations League A match against Italy.

Career statistics

Club

International

References

External links

1995 births
Living people
Footballers from Split, Croatia
Association football fullbacks
Bosnia and Herzegovina footballers
Bosnia and Herzegovina international footballers
Croatian footballers
CD Torrevieja players
Elche CF Ilicitano footballers
CD Vitoria footballers
NK Široki Brijeg players
NK Lokomotiva Zagreb players
Segunda División B players
Tercera División players
Premier League of Bosnia and Herzegovina players
Croatian Football League players
Bosnia and Herzegovina expatriate footballers
Croatian expatriate footballers
Expatriate footballers in Spain
Bosnia and Herzegovina expatriate sportspeople in Spain
Croatian expatriate sportspeople in Spain